Luzhi may refer to the following locations in China

 Luzhi, Suzhou (甪直古镇), town in Wuzhong District, Suzhou
 Luzhi Township (芦芝乡), in Zhangping, Fujian